Jane Wanjuki Njiru is a Kenyan politician. She is the Embu County women representative and a member of the ruling political party, the jubilee party of Kenya. She vied and won the Embu woman representative post in the 2017 General election.

Early life and education 
She went to Mulango Girls High School for her Kenya Certificate of education in 1971 to 1974.  She furthered her education at Kenya Management and Training Institute where she acquired a Advanced Diploma in management, Advance Diploma in Sale and Marketing and Diploma in Public Relations. She is the new vice-chairperson of the Communication, Information and Innovation committee in the parliament. She is a member of Departmental Committee on Lands and Constitutional Implementation Oversight Committee in 12th parliament.

Career 
Njiru was elected as the Embu county women representative in 2017. She worked as a Chief Executive Officer at New day Motors Limited in 2006 to 2017 and in 1979 to 2006 she was Sales and Marketing Associate at Telecom Kenya.

References

Kenyan women in politics
Kenyan women representatives
Members of the National Assembly (Kenya)
Year of birth missing (living people)
Living people